= 2007 World Championships in Athletics qualification standards =

Qualifying standards for the 2007 World Championships in Athletics can be found here - IAAF World Championships in Athletics Osaka
